Genghis Tron is an American four-piece cybergrind band formed in Poughkeepsie, New York, United States, and latterly based in Brooklyn, New York and San Francisco, California. The band signed to Relapse Records after releasing two recordings on Crucial Blast. The group went on an indefinite hiatus in 2010, but returned in 2020 and soon after announced a new album, Dream Weapon, in March 2021.

History

2006-2010: Dead Mountain Mouth, Board Up the House and hiatus
Around the same time of starting Genghis Tron, vocalist Mookie Singerman sang and played guitar in the two-piece project Glitter Pals with his friend Jake Friedman while they were attending Vassar College. Friedman also featured on the song "Laser Bitch" on Genghis Tron's EP  Cloak of Love (2005).

Genghis Tron has toured with such bands as Behold... the Arctopus, Converge, Kylesa, Gaza, The Dillinger Escape Plan and The Faint.

In 2008 the band released an album, Board Up the House. It was named a "Critic's Choice" by The New York Times and was also awarded the title "Album of the Year" by the magazine Rock Sound.

In late 2010, the band members decided to take a break away from the band for a while, but assured fans in a Myspace message that they will be back with new material when they start playing together again.

2020-present: Return and Dream Weapon
On August 10, 2020, the band announced that they had returned from their hiatus and began recording their third album with Kurt Ballou. This return also saw the addition of drummer Nick Yacyshyn, who is the band's first drummer due to the band using a drum machine for previous releases. Founder and vocalist Mookie Singerman did not rejoin the band and was replaced by Tony Wolski.

In January 2021, the band announced their third album, Dream Weapon, would be released on March 26. The album marks a shift in the band's previously heavy/extreme sound, leaning towards a "more meditative, hypnotic, and maybe psychedelic" direction. The record is completely devoid of blast beats and screamed vocals.

Style
The band is noted for its creative combination of various types of metal and electronic music. Although often classified as cybergrind early in their career, Genghis Tron developed a more diverse sound, which included elements of IDM, doom metal, electronic and ambient, in addition to their core style of synth-laden metal. 

Forgoing both a drummer and a bass guitarist, the band utilizes computer-based sequencers such as FL Studio and Ableton Live, as well as multiple synthesizers (Moog, Alesis and Novation) to produce its distinct sound.

Members
Current members
Michael Sochynsky – keyboards, programming 
Hamilton Jordan – guitar 
Tony Wolski – vocals 
Nick Yacyshyn – drums 

Past members
Mookie Singerman – vocals, keyboards

Timeline

Discography

Studio albums
Dead Mountain Mouth (2006)
Board Up the House  (2008)
Dream Weapon (2021)

EPs
Cloak of Love (2005, Crucial Blast, Lovepump United (vinyl))
Cape of Hate (2006, Crucial Bliss)
Triple Black Diamond (2007, Crucial Bliss)

Remix series
Board Up the House Remixes Volume 1 (2008, Temporary Residence Limited)
Board Up the House Remixes Volume 2 (2008, Lovepump United)
Board Up the House Remixes Volume 3 (2008, Relapse Records)
Board Up the House Remixes Volume 4 (2008, Anticon)
Board Up the House Remixes Volume 5 (2009, Crucial Blast)

Demo
Laser Bitch (2004, self-released)

Music videos

References

External links
 Genghis Tron on Relapse Records

Heavy metal musical groups from New York (state)
American grindcore musical groups
American musical trios
Relapse Records artists
Musical groups established in 2004
Vassar College alumni
Anticon
The Westminster Schools alumni